Necmi Gençalp (born 1960), is a Turkish wrestler. He was born in Yozgat. He was silver medalist in Freestyle wrestling at the 1988 Summer Olympics.

References

External links
 

1960 births
Living people
Sportspeople from Yozgat
Olympic wrestlers of Turkey
Wrestlers at the 1988 Summer Olympics
Turkish male sport wrestlers
Olympic silver medalists for Turkey
Olympic medalists in wrestling
Medalists at the 1988 Summer Olympics
Mediterranean Games gold medalists for Turkey
Mediterranean Games medalists in wrestling
Competitors at the 1987 Mediterranean Games
20th-century Turkish people
21st-century Turkish people